La Victoria is a town and municipality in the Colombian Department of Boyacá, part of the subregion of the Western Boyacá Province.

Municipalities of Boyacá Department